The Division of Hinkler is an Australian Electoral Division in Queensland.

Geography
Since 1984, federal electoral division boundaries in Australia have been determined at redistributions by a redistribution committee appointed by the Australian Electoral Commission. Redistributions occur for the boundaries of divisions in a particular state, and they occur every seven years, or sooner if a state's representation entitlement changes or when divisions of a state are malapportioned.

History 

The division was created in 1984 and is named after Bert Hinkler, the great pioneer Australian aviator.

The seat is located in coastal Queensland, including the towns of Bundaberg, Hervey Bay, Childers, Gayndah and Monto.

The electoral division had previously centred on Gladstone and its surrounding area. On those boundaries, it was a marginal seat that traded hands between the Australian Labor Party and the National Party of Australia.  However, after a redistribution in 2006, the Gladstone area, a Labor bastion, was transferred to the Division of Flynn.  This seemingly consolidated the Nationals' hold on the seat.  While National incumbent Paul Neville was nearly swept out in 2007 due in part to Queensland swinging heavily to Labor under Kevin Rudd, he survived in part due to Gladstone being replaced with conservative-leaning Hervey Bay. He was reelected with a large enough swing in 2010 to turn Hinkler into a safe seat for the merged Liberal National Party.

Members

Election results

References

External links
 Division of Hinkler (Qld) — Australian Electoral Commission

Electoral divisions of Australia
Constituencies established in 1984
1984 establishments in Australia
Federal politics in Queensland
Bundaberg